Hummingbird sage is a common name for two different species of sage: 

Salvia guaranitica, native to South America
Salvia spathacea, native to California

Salvia